Edmund Poole King (21 January 1907 – 11 September 1990) was an English cricketer.  King was a right-handed batsman.  He was born at Clifton, Bristol, and was educated at Winchester College, where he represented the college cricket team.

King made his first-class debut for Gloucestershire against Glamorgan in the 1927 County Championship.  He made 2 further first-class appearances, both in 1927, against Kent and Sussex.  His 3 first-class matches were without success, with him scoring 14 runs at an average of 3.50, with a high score of 6.

He died at Bampton, Devon, on 11 September 1990.

References

External links
Edmund King at ESPNcricinfo
Edmund King at CricketArchive

1907 births
1990 deaths
Cricketers from Bristol
People educated at Winchester College
English cricketers
Gloucestershire cricketers